Tortorici (Sicilian: Turturici) is a comune (municipality) in the Metropolitan City of Messina in the Italian region Sicily, located about  east of Palermo and about  west of Messina.

Located in the Nebrodi regional park, Tortorici borders the following municipalities: Bronte, Castell'Umberto, Floresta, Galati Mamertino, Longi, Randazzo, San Salvatore di Fitalia, Sinagra, Ucria.

People
 Adriana Faranda (born 1950)

Main sights
San Francesco: church and monastery

References

External links 
 

Cities and towns in Sicily